Patricia E. Kelly is an African-American cowgirl, founder, and CEO of the non-profit organization Ebony Horsewomen, Inc, in Hartford. She is a trained equestrian instructor certified as Master Urban Riding and Equine Husbandry instructor as well as Equine Assisted Growth specialist.

Kelly, considered an equestrian trailblazer, has been recognized as one of CNN’s Top 10 Heroes of 2014 and as one of Aetna’s Champions for Change.

Early life   
Patricia was born and grew up in Hartford, Connecticut, one of the richest states in America but with great disparity between rich and poor. For this reason, she experienced the effects of inequality. From a young age, she was passionate about horse riding and horses and at nine years old she learned how to ride thanks to her neighbor, a Jewish grocer who owned a horse.

She served the United States as a U.S. marine during the Vietnam War and in 1984 she founded Ebony Horsewomen, a non-profit organization.

Commitments   
In 1984, Kelly founded Ebony Horsewomen intending to create an organization for the cultural and social enrichment of black women. In 1987 the organization changed to focus from women to children and began providing the city’s youth with a positive outlet. Nowadays, Ebony Horsewomen (EHI) is an urban riding center in Hartford Connecticut. Since its creation, it has helped the community's youth, families, adults, and military veterans through equine-assisted psychotherapy, therapeutic riding, and a variety of youth programs.

Thanks to her work, she was chosen as one of the 2014 Top Ten CNN Heroes.

References 

African-American founders
Year of birth missing (living people)
Living people